A list of films produced in South Korea in 1995:

See also
1995 in South Korea

External links

 1990-1995 at www.koreanfilm.org

1995
South Korean
1995 in South Korea